Mike Dyer may refer to:

 Mike Dyer (baseball) (born 1966), retired Major League Baseball pitcher
 Mike Dyer (sportswriter) (born 1939), retired sportswriter 
 Michael Dyer (born 1990), American football running back